Princess Ai (lit. The Story of Princess Ai) is a manga series created and co-written by American musician and singer Courtney Love and Stuart Levy, with illustration by Ai Yazawa and Misaho Kujiradou. Based in part on Love's own life, the manga follows an amnesiac alien character, Ai, who is transported to Tokyo from her war-torn homeland, where she attempts to piece her life together.

Co-written by Love and Levy, the manga was initially featured in Japan in Shinshokan's Wings magazine, and later published in English by Tokyopop in three volumes between 2004 and 2006. A sequel, Princess Ai: The Prism of Midnight Dawn, was later published in two volumes in 2008 and 2010, respectively, and was written by Christine Boylan and Levy. Tokyopop re-released the original Princess Ai series in one volume, Princess Ai: The Ultimate Edition on October 9, 2007.

Additionally, comic strips, art books, coloring books, fan books, and action figures based on the series and its characters have been released.

Premise
A young, amnesiac alien girl known only as Princess Ai is mysteriously transported to Tokyo, Japan from her war-torn home, Ai-Land, which is in the midst of a revolution. With only a heart-shaped box to clue her in on her past, Ai makes her living as a rock star at Club Cupid. She falls in love with a sensitive musician, Kent, much to the distaste of Kent's gay, possessive roommate, Hikaru. But Hikaru is the least of Ai's worries when gun-toting talent agents and demons seeking to take control of Ai's homeland, Ai-Land, are hot on her trail.

Characters

Main characters
Ai - Princess Ai is the main character of the story. She is the product of a relationship between her human father, King Sei, and a Dougen (Angel) female. Because of the war that rages between the Humans and the Dougen in Ai-Land, Ai's true parentage was kept a secret, even from Ai herself. Due to her mixed heritage, Ai sprouted wings on her back, tinged with red, and has the ability to control people's emotions with her singing. Also, Ai loves Nora and Kent, and she is torn between the two. 
She is fiercely independent. She first learns she had wings in chapter 5. 
She likes to wear torn clothes; if not, she cuts them. She eventually stops doing it once she got into H.T.A. 
Her heart-shaped box she always kept with her is made of pure tenketsu, the blood of angels, the primary source of energy throughout Ai-Land. If humans touch it, it leads inevitably to death. If Dougen touch it, they eventually get a narcotic reaction.
She remembers in chapter 12 that Queen Lilith isn't her real mother but she still has the royal birthmark of a red rose on her right thigh.
Her real powers came out in chapter 15, a power even greater than tenketsu — the power to create light.
Kent - Kent is a young man who works at the Shinjuku University library part-time. Kent was one of the first people to discover Ai after she appeared in Tokyo, and offered her a place to stay, an action which caused a lot of friction with his roommate Hikaru. Like Ai, he is of a mixed heritage, being half-Japanese and half-American, and uses this fact to help Ai come to grips with her dual heritage (chapter 11).
If it wasn't for Ai's pendant inside her heart-shaped box, Kent would have died protecting Ai from one of Meggi's tenketsu arrows.

Human characters
Fa'an - He is a street musician with strangely compelling lyrics who helps Ai discover her flair for singing. He has a knack for appearing and disappearing at just the right time. He watches out for Ai, and is associated with the fallen (Princess Ai : Prism of Midnight Dawn). He is a mysterious person who knows of Ai's past. He even gave the key which unlocks Ai's heart-shaped box.
It was revealed in chapter 14 that Fa'an is a watcher, kind of like a guardian angel. He has the power to turn into a vulture.
Daisuke - He is Kent's coworker at the Shinjuku University library. Each time Ai came to the library, he tried asking her out, which always ended up being interrupted by Kent.
Hikaru - He is Kent's gay roommate. Hikaru has a huge crush on Kent and a hatred for Ai, fueled by jealousy. Later on in the series, he makes peace with Ai and becomes one of her biggest supporters (volume 3, chapter 11).
Takeshi - Tough, tattooed, and tawdry, he is a VIP at the nightclub Club Cupid who just happens to work for H.T.A., the hottest talent agency (fictional) in Japan. He was ordered by Hayabusa to eliminate Ai during her worldwide stadium tour but his emotions got in the way (chapter 14).
Hayabusa - Takeshi's boss, the powerful president of H.T.A. (Hayabusa Talent Agency), who is allegedly connected with the Yakuza (the Japanese mob). He has major plans for Ai's debut - evil plans. After the destructive event in chapter 10, Hayabusa told Takeshi to have Ai record more songs, go on a stadium tour, and eliminate her on worldwide television. Then she will become a legend. All her unreleased content, music videos, remixes, will be under H.T.A. control and the money will be rolling in for a very long time. He was arrested in chapter 15 for what was about to happen to Ai and various other crimes.
Yoshi - Ai's personal assistant seen in volume 2. He is sometimes mistaken for a very tall woman.
Hiro - Ai's manager at H.T.A. He is ordered by Hayabusa to keep Ai under control. He tries to kill Ai during a blackout in chapter 15 but her true powers came to light. He got arrested for shooting the gun at Ai.
Lissa - She is Ai's tutor back in Ai-Land. She was Ai's best friend but Ai kept her wings a secret from her. From a flashback in chapter 12, Lissa told Ai that Queen Lilith wasn't her real mother.
Club Cupid
Shinji - The manager of Club Cupid. He lets Ai sing at Club Cupid.
Mika - A rude woman at Club Cupid, who calls Ai trashy. She wants Takeshi to notice her own talent and get into H.T.A. instead of Ai's.
Jen - The one singer at Club Cupid who takes the time to befriend Ai. Later on in the story, Jen dies getting Ai's heart-shaped box back from a robber.

The Dougen
The Dougen are non-human creatures which live in Ai-Land. The most royal of them are angels.
 Angels
Nora - A leader of the revolutionaries in Ai-Land, this Angel wants equality—not superiority—over humans, but not everyone shares his views. He got really close to Ai and sent her to Earth for her safety. He didn't know that Ai was one of them but knew that Ai is someone who will change the world.
Kaz - Nora's radical cousin who believes that the human royal family must be conquered at all costs. Much to Nora's dismay, Kaz dispatched Tess to capture Ai. But later on, he discovers the truth about Ai and understands Nora's point (chapter 15).
Kemo - He is only seen in Princess Ai: The Prism of Midnight Dawn. He is one of the angels who helped with the second revolution, and is in league with Kaz. However, he now harbours a personal revenge against Ai, and is on the brink of insanity.
 Furies
Tess -  One of the 3 Furies of Ai-Land, she was sent to search out and drag Ai back to her planet. After a radical change of heart, she becomes Ai's protector (chapter 10). She understands that Ai is the key for peace in Ai-Land and Nora's plan is the right one. She has a dragon on each of her red wings which spews out fire. They are weak to liquid.
Meggi - The second Furie sister to be sent out to fetch Ai in chapter 11. She is Tess's younger sister. She is devoted to Kaz and is weak to flowers. She uses jealousy and vengeance to manipulate her enemies. She has snakes on each of her wings.
Alexa - She is third Furie Sisters to be sent out in chapter 13. She is Tess's and Meggi's sister, and Kaz's last hope to return Ai to Ai-Land. She has the power to freeze time. It is suspected that she has a crush on Takeshi.

Background
Princess Ai is a loose adaptation of Courtney Love's life story, with Ai functioning as Love's fantasy alter ego. In a 2003 interview concerning the series, Love stated: "I have always loved the Japanese culture and people. Princess Ai is a great character, because she feels like my alter ego, but in a fantasy setting." The word "Ai" means "love" in Japanese. It is also generally believed that Kent, the sensitive, blonde guitar player who becomes Ai's love interest, is based on Courtney Love's late husband, Kurt Cobain.

Co-created and co-written by Love and D.J. Milky, the initial run of Princess Ai was written and illustrated by Misaho Kujiradou and featured character designs by Ai Yazawa. According to Nielsen BookScan sales reports, Princess Ai topped the Adult Fiction Overall Trade Paper Graphic Novels list for the week ending July 25, 2004. Princess Ai was published in three volumes from July 6, 2004 to February 7, 2006.Madman Entertainment released Princess Ai in New Zealand and Australia. The series is also licensed in Germany by Tokyopop Germany, in France by Soleil Manga, in Italy by J-Pop, in Finland by Punainen jättiläinen, and in Russia by Comix-ART.

The sequel, Princess Ai: The Prism of Midnight Dawn, was published by Tokyopop in two volumes in December 2008 and December 2009. It is also licensed in Germany by Tokyopop Germany, in France by Soleil Manga, and in Italy by J-Pop.

Volume 3 of Princess Ai: The Prism of Midnight Dawn was planned to be released on March 1, 2011, but, as of 2019, remains unreleased.

Publications

Manga

Princess Ai

Princess Ai: The Prism of Midnight Dawn

Other media
Multiple books based on Princess Ai have been published by Tokyopop. A 72-page art book, Princess Ai: Roses & Tattoos, which included poetry by D.J. Milky, was published on February 13, 2007. On March 12, 2008,  Princess Ai: Rumors From The Other Side, a fan book which contained twelve short stories, was published.

Additionally, a colored comic strip collection, Princess Ai of Ai-Land: The Comic Strip Collection, was published on July 8, 2008. On September 1, 2008, Princess Ai: Encounters was released; it featured Princess Ai meeting characters from other Tokyopop manga. Running Press also published a 128-page coloring book, Color Me Manga: Princess Ai, on November 12, 2007.

Merchandise
In 2005, the Los Angeles-based company Bleeding Edge released a series of action figures based on Princess Ai. These included  and  figures of Princess Ai in various states and attires based on scenes in the manga, including: "Angelic", "Borrowed Threads", "Club Cupid", "Evening", "Fell to Earth", and "Rock 'n' Roll" Ai.

At the 2005 San Diego Comic-Con, a Princess Ai cosplay contest was held, with Bleeding Edge providing the action figures as prizes.

References

Sources

External links
Princess Ai at Tokyopop
 Princess Ai: The Prism of Midnight Dawn at Tokyopop

2004 manga
2005 manga
2006 manga
2008 manga
2009 manga
Ai Yazawa
Dark fantasy anime and manga
Extraterrestrials in anime and manga
Fiction about amnesia
LGBT in anime and manga
Shinshokan manga
Shōjo manga
Tokyopop titles
Transhumanism in anime and manga
Works by Courtney Love